Khondakar Abul Kashem (3 January 1944 – 9 September 1971) was a Bengali educator and of the former East Pakistan, now Bangladesh. He was one of the Bengali intellectuals killed by the Pakistan Army's paramilitary Razakar during the 1971 Bangladesh Genocide.

Early life
Kashem was born on 3 January 1944 in Chomarpur, Santhia, Pabna. In 1960, he graduated from Rajarhat High School. In 1964, he graduated from Pabna Edward College. In 1966 he undergrad in education from Dhaka University. In 1969, he finished his graduate school in History from Rajshahi University.

Career
In 1966, Kashem joined Kashinathpur A L High School after graduation in Pabna. In 1970, he joined as Lecturer of History in Pabna Edward College. He spent 6 months in Pakistan Cadet Corps in Savar. At the start of Bangladesh Liberation war in 1971, he returned to his village to encouraged the youths to join the war. He organized supplies for the Mukti Bahini.

Assassination
He was returning from his village in Pabna on 9 September 1971 when he was kidnapped by members of Razakars near the Chhondaha bridge. He remained missing after that.

References

1944 births
1971 deaths
University of Dhaka alumni
Alumni of King's College London
Bangladeshi academics
People killed in the Bangladesh Liberation War
People from Pabna District
Mukti Bahini personnel
Pabna Edward College alumni